List of events in 2017 in eSports (also known as professional gaming).

Calendar of events

Tournaments

Awards 
 Esports Industry Awards 2017

Television series 
 The King's Avatar (donghua)

References

 
Esports by year